Butler Township is a township in Harrison County, in the U.S. state of Missouri.

Butler Township has the name of Aneph M. Butler, a pioneer citizen.

References

Townships in Missouri
Townships in Harrison County, Missouri